Melanie Ruth Daiken (27 July 1945 - 25 June 2016) was an English composer and music educator. She was born in London, the daughter of a Canadian mother  and Leslie Daiken, a Russian-Jewish writer from Ireland. She began violin lessons at an early age, and studied piano and composition at the Royal Academy of Music, the University of Ghana, and the Paris Conservatoire with Yvonne Loriod and Olivier Messiaen. After completing her studies, she took a teaching position with the Royal Academy of Music and became Deputy Head of Composition in 1986.

Works
Eusebius, opera
Playboy of the Western World, opera
Mayakovsky and the Sun, opera

References

1945 births
2016 deaths
20th-century classical composers
British Jews
British music educators
English classical composers
British women classical composers
Jewish women composers
20th-century English composers
20th-century English women musicians
Women music educators
20th-century women composers